Atmiya University is a private university located in  Rajkot, Gujarat, India. It was established in March 2018 by Sarvodaya Kelavni Samaj under Gujarat Private Universities (Second Amendment) Act, 2018, after the Bill was approved in March of that year.

References

External links

Universities in Gujarat
2018 establishments in Gujarat
Educational institutions established in 2018